Events from the 1350s in England.

Incumbents
Monarch – Edward III

Events
 1350
 29 August – Battle of Winchelsea (Les Espagnols sur Mer) off the south coast of England: An English fleet personally commanded by King Edward III defeats a Castilian fleet.
 26 October – Sir William de Thorpe, Chief Justice of the King's Bench, is imprisoned for taking bribes.
 "Gough Map" of England produced; the first to accurately plot distances and show the true shape of the country.
 1351
 14 January – Parliament passes the Treason Act, codifying and curtailing the offence.
 February – Statute of Labourers enacted to fix labour costs at 1346 levels due to the increases caused by the Black Death.
 26 March – Combat of the Thirty: thirty picked knights each from the Kingdoms of France and England fight in Brittany to determine who will rule the Duchy of Brittany as part of the War of the Breton Succession; a Franco-Breton victory is secured.
 8 April – Hundred Years' War: At the Battle of Taillebourg in Gascony, the French are defeated by the English.
 Statute of Provisions forbids the Pope from appointing clergy to English benefices.
 1352
 August – Hundred Years' War: English forces heavily defeat the French at the Battle of Mauron in Brittany.
 7 November – Corpus Christi College founded as a College of the University of Cambridge by the Guilds of Corpus Christi and the Blessed Virgin Mary.
 1353
 The first statute of praemunire prevents English subjects appealing to foreign courts, especially the Roman Curia.
 Hundred Years' War: Peace negotiations with France.
 1354
 April – resumption of the Hundred Years' War between France and England.
 Scottish army captures Berwick-upon-Tweed.
 The Statute of the Staple is enacted, protecting the wool trade.
 Statute makes it illegal for anyone to be executed or deprived of their real property without being given the opportunity to answer their accusers in court.
 1355
 10 February – St Scholastica Day riot in Oxford breaks out leaving 63 scholars and perhaps 30 locals dead in two days.
 August – Battle of Nesbit Moor: Scottish army decisively defeats the English.
 5 October–2 December – Hundred Years' War: Black Prince's chevauchée of 1355: A large mounted Anglo-Gascon force under the command of Edward the Black Prince marches from Bordeaux in English-held Gascony 300 miles (480 km) south to Narbonne and back, devastating a wide swathe of French territory.
 1356
 20 January – Edward Balliol surrenders title as King of Scotland to Edward III of England.
 19 September – Hundred Years' War: at the Battle of Poitiers, the English, commanded by the Black Prince, defeat the French and capture King John II of France in the process.
 1357
 22 March – Hundred Years' War: a two-year truce is declared at Bordeaux between France and England.
 6 November – King David II of Scotland ransomed back to Scotland.
 Humber estuary port of Ravenser Odd abandoned following flooding.
 1358
 April – "Round Table" tournament held at Windsor Castle, attracting contestants from across Europe.
 Hundred Years' War: The captive French King John II agrees to restore much of the Angevin lands to England, but this is rejected by his son Dauphin Charles.
 1359
 24 March – Hundred Years' War: Second Treaty of London signed between England and France, but rejected by the French States-General on 25 May.
 4 December – Edward III lays siege to Rouen in France.
 December – Hundred Years' War: English blockade Rheims.

Deaths
1352
William de Ros, 3rd Baron de Ros (born 1325)
 Laurence Minot, poet (born 1300)
1353
Roger Grey, 1st Baron Grey de Ruthyn (year of birth unknown)
1358
 22 August – Isabella of France, queen of King Edward II (born 1295)

References